King Lumber Company Warehouse is a historic warehouse building located at Charlottesville, Virginia. It was built in 1909, and is a three-bay, three bay by five bay brick building. It has a low gable roof with stepped gables and corbeled cornice stops.  The King Lumber Company manufactured
building materials that were used throughout the United States, including in many buildings at the University of Virginia. The company closed in the 1930s.

It was listed on the National Register of Historic Places in 1983.

References

Commercial buildings on the National Register of Historic Places in Virginia
Commercial buildings completed in 1909
Buildings and structures in Charlottesville, Virginia
National Register of Historic Places in Charlottesville, Virginia